Abubakar Khamidovich Kadyrov (born August 26, 1996) is a former Russian footballer who played as a striker.

Career
Kadyrov made his professional debut for FC Akhmat Grozny on August 22, 2020 in the Russian Premier League against FC Khimki. He retired on October 27, 2022.

Career statistics

Club

Personal life
Kadyrov is a nephew of Chechen politician Ramzan Kadyrov.

References

External links
 
 

1996 births
People from Gudermessky District
Russian people of Chechen descent
Chechen people
Living people
Russian footballers
Association football forwards
FC Akhmat Grozny players
Russian Premier League players
Sportspeople from Chechnya